Suresh Damu Bhole (Rajumama) is a member of the 13th Maharashtra Legislative Assembly. He represents the Jalgaon City Assembly Constituency. He belongs to the Bharatiya Janata Party and is President of Bharatiya Janata Party Jalgaon District. People call him Rajumama with love.

References

Maharashtra MLAs 2019–2024
People from Jalgaon
Living people
Marathi politicians
Bharatiya Janata Party politicians from Maharashtra
1965 births